Dongcheng Subdistrict is one of the four subdistricts of Dongguan, Guangdong Province, China. The subdistrict has an area of 105.9 square kilometers, and, as of 2019, has a permanent population of around 500,000, and a registered population of around 99,500. Dongcheng Subdistrict's GDP as of 2019 is ¥58.656 billion.

History 
In 1958, Fucheng Commune was established. The commune existed until 1983, when it was changed to a district. The district was revoked in 1988 for Fucheng Subdistrict. In March 2000, Dongguan renamed Fucheng Subdistrict to Dongcheng Subdistrict.

Administrative divisions 
Dongcheng is divided into 23 residential communities and 2 living districts.

Economy 
As of 2019, the subdistrict's GDP was ¥58.656 billion, retail sales totaled ¥16.916 billion, fixed asset investment was ¥9.617 billion, international trade totaled ¥50.74 billion, and the subdistrict's tax revenue totaled ¥13.535 billion.

Major enterprises with a presence within Dongcheng Subdistrict include Hsu Fu Chi, Rohm and Haas, Wanshida LCD, CR Snow, Meiwei Circuits, Guangrun Furniture, Tecsun, and CYG Insulator Co. LTD.

Major retail and office centers within Dongcheng Subdistrict include Dongcheng Wanda Square, Dongcheng Shibo Square, Xinghe City, Junhao Business Center, and Yujing New Time Square.

Transport

Road 
There are four main highways in Dongcheng Subdistrict. Two expressways, the Dongguan-Shenzhen Expressway and the Guangzhou-Shenzhen Expressway, go through the Dongcheng Subdistrict. The public transport is convenient, 16 buses go through the center of the Dongcheng Subdistrict.

Metro 

Line 2 of the Dongguan Rail Transit opened to the public on May 27, 2016, the only one of the four planned lines to be open as of 2020. Four stations on Line 2 are located within Dongcheng Subdistrict: Qifeng Park, Dongcheng, Xiaqiao, and Lihua Park.

Line 2 is connected to the Guangzhou-Shenzhen-Hong Kong Express Rail and the Guangzhou-Dongguan-Shenzhen Intercity Rail via Humen Station.

Tourist attractions

Qifeng Park 
Qifeng City Park is a prominent park in Dongguan, covering an area of 1,600 mu. Well known attractions within the park include Huangqi Mountain, Huangqi Guanyin Temple, and the Huangqi Mountain lanterns. The park is a popular hiking spot for residents of Dongguan.

Huangqi Mountain rises 189 meters above sea level. Huangqi Guanyin Temple, which was built in the Song Dynasty, is located at the foot of the hill. During Chinese New Year and other major festivals, tourists come to the park to pray. It is also tradition that people climb Huangqi Mountain during Chinese New Year.

The park is 800 meters away from the Qifeng Park Station, and is 1,800 meters away from Dongcheng Station.

Huying Country Park 
Huying Country Park, located in southeast Dongcheng Subdistrict and formerly known as Huying Tree Farm, is a large park covering an area of 2,979 mu. The park, which opened at the end of 2000, is largely hilly and forested, with its highest point reaching 152 meters in altitude. Popular attractions in the park include Huying Pavilion, Qingyou Gorge, the island within the lake, Yunyu Bridge, Roman Pillar Forest, and Huanhu Road. Huying Country Park also contains the Shaokaochang Sculpture Park, which has areas of sculptures devoted to important military and scientific figures. Sculptures which depict other matters, like famous ancient and modern figures and animals, can be found scattered throughout the park.

Liuhua Park 

The Liuhua Park was first built in the Ming dynasty, and it reopened in 1999. It has an area of 0.32 square kilometers, and is near the intersection of Guanlong Highway and Guanjie Highway. The park is open all day and has free admission. It is a key unit of Dongguan's cultural relics protection.

In 1938, the first armed resistance to the Japanese occupation of China in Dongguan happened near the Liuhua Pagoda, and a memorial pavilion near the pagoda has been erected to commemorate it.

Others attractions within the park include Honghua Temple, Huaxi Yintang, and Qiniang Lake.

Dongcheng Culture Square 
The Dongcheng Culture Square is a multi-functional entertainment venue, is located on Dongcheng Road, with an area of 40,000 square meters. The complex including a 1,300-seat theatre, a gym, a library and an open-air music fountain.

Education 
Notable schools within Dongcheng Substrict include Dongcheng Junior Middle School, Dongcheng No. 1 Middle School, Dongcheng Lingnan School, Dongcheng Primary School, Dongcheng No. 5 Primary School, Primary School attached to Dongguan Normal University, and Dongguan Chaotian Experimental Primary School.

Healthcare 

There are 655 medical institutions in Dongcheng Subdistrict. The subdistrict's hospitals include Donghua Hospital attached to Sun Yat-sen University, Dongcheng People's Hospital, Dongguan No. 6 People's Hospital, and Dongguan Taixin Hospital.

References 

Township-level divisions of Guangdong
Geography of Dongguan
Subdistricts of the People's Republic of China